The California Republican Assembly (CRA) is a conservative California Republican activist group.  It is the oldest and largest grassroots volunteer organization chartered by the California Republican Party, and is the California affiliate of the National Federation of Republican Assemblies (NFRA).

The CRA can date its origin to the 1930s and was an early supporter of Governor Earl Warren but also an early opponent of Chief Justice Earl Warren, whom it believed had moved left from his gubernatorial days to his time on the court and so was regarded as far too liberal to merit support by conservatives. The CRA was largely supportive of the efforts of Barry Goldwater's Presidential bid and helped him finalize his nomination at the 1964 Republican National Convention held in San Francisco. Later that year it helped the cause of George Murphy, a former movie actor and close friend of Ronald Reagan in being elected to the United States Senate, and then helped Reagan himself to be elected Governor of California in 1966.

The group claims to hold much of the responsibility for the "Reagan Revolution".  Ronald Reagan often referred to CRA as the "Conscience of the Republican Party."  Unlike some other conservative political groups, it makes no pretense at being nonpartisan; the "CRA has been working to elect Republican candidates who stand unwaveringly for Republican principles," according to their website.  It is anti-abortion and pro-"family values" and it supports a limited-government agenda calling for lower taxes, less governmental regulation, and more personal freedom.  In the 1990s it spawned a national organization based on its own efforts, the National Federation of Republican Assemblies, which now has affiliates in approximately forty states.

External links
Official Website

Politics of California
Republican Party (United States) organizations
Conservative organizations in the United States